This is a list of video games featuring various Looney Tunes characters.
Platforms: Arcade, Atari 2600, PC, Commodore 64, Nintendo Entertainment System, Amstrad CPC, ZX Spectrum, Game Boy, Handheld Electronic Game, DOS, Super Nintendo Entertainment System, Sega Genesis, Sega Master System, Sega Game Gear, Game Boy Color, PlayStation, Microsoft Windows, Nintendo 64, PlayStation 2, GameCube, Xbox, Game Boy Advance, Nintendo DS, Browser, Wii, and Xbox 360.

Bugs Bunny series

Daffy Duck series

Tasmanian Devil series

Wile E. Coyote and the Road Runner series

Speedy Gonzales series

Sylvester and Tweety series

Other games

See also 
 List of Tiny Toon Adventures video games

Sources 

 
Lists of video games based on works
Looney Tunes